Dolicholatirus cayohuesonicus is a species of small sea snail, a marine gastropod mollusk in the family Fasciolariidae, the spindle snails, tulip snails and their allies.

References

Fasciolariidae
Gastropods described in 1879